Mato Leitão is a municipality in the state of Rio Grande do Sul, Brazil.

Geography 

Mato Leitão is located at a latitude 29º31'28" south and a longitude 52º07'43" west, being at an altitude of 81 meters (266 feet).

It has an area of 45.9 km² (17.7 mi²) and a population of 3 869 inhabitants (2010).

In the main avenue of the city, Leopoldo A. Hinterholz Av., are located the cathedral, the prefecture, the SEUBV and most of the local trade.

Culture and Economy 

Known as the "Capital of the beautiful woman" and the "City of Orchids", Mato Leitão is a city of German colonization that has its economy based on agriculture - especially corn and tobacco - and food and footwear industry.

It's a peaceful place, where you can find typical German cookery and festivities. A curiosity is that there are many localities in Mato Leitão where people talk preferentially speak German to Portuguese.

Quality of Life 

There are 4 schools in Mato Leitão, only 1 with High Schools' studies. However, Mato Leitão is considered as a reference in education, being in the top 15 at the state. Similarly, public health is a source of pride.

As an example, Mato Leitão has a 96.2% literacy rate and HDI of 0.746.

Also, Mato Leitão is a very safe place, where crimes like thefts and murders are extremely rare.

See also 
 List of municipalities in Rio Grande do Sul

References

External links 
 FEEDADOS: http://feedados.fee.tche.br/
 Municipal Anthem: http://pt.wikisource.org/wiki/Hino_do_munic%C3%ADpio_de_Mato_Leit%C3%A3o

Municipalities in Rio Grande do Sul